The following are the winners of the 11th annual ENnie Awards, held in 2011:

Judges' Spotlight Winners 
Eat and Run (Brainpan Games)
Fortune’s Fool (Pantheon Press)
Outbreak: Undead (Hunters Books)
Smallville (Margaret Weis Productions)
Wayfinder #4: The Mwangi Expanse (Paizo Fans United)

Gold and Silver Winners

References

External links
 2011 ENnie Awards

 
ENnies winners